Rafael Cardenas (born 1971) is a Mexican-American photographer based in East Los Angeles and Boyle Heights.

Biography 
Rafael Cardenas was born in 1971 in Jalisco, Mexico. He was raised in East Los Angeles and considers the city a huge influence on him as a person and as an artist. In particular, he finds the Eastside, east of the L.A. river as inspiration for his work. Ever since he was a child, he would carry a Kodak 110 or a Canon Rebel to photograph his daily life, and it was only after buying a professional Canon EOS 10D from a former colleague in 2010 did he begin to practice professionally.

Prior to becoming a professional photographer, he held different administrative assistant positions in the medical and legal fields. He also created some graphic design projects, acting on stage and screen, and fronting for a Los Angeles band named Slowrider. In 2009, he began working for the local art magazine, Citizen L.A., and he started taking his own photographs for his articles.

Photography 
His work consists primarily of black-and-white photographs documenting the Angeleno streets and its communities.  The editing process for Cardenas is crucial, and by doing it every day, he created his signature black-and-white style. For the creative process behind his photography, he tends to always be "in the moment" because he never knows when he's going to shoot and he seeks out to capture scenes he finds interesting. When Cardenas began photographing he never framed his shots behind any political agenda or with an artist statement in mind, but that conclusion came after editing. As neighborhoods start changing with people and businesses being displaced he finds his documentation more important than ever.

Artworks 
Cardenas is a self-taught photographer who documents East Los Angeles with the purpose of discovery, producing work, and capturing moments.

RAFA 2020 (2020)

In 2010, he started his first 365-day photo series where he would shoot thousands of photos a day.  He revisted this project in 2020 and in doing so, captured the Covid pandemic.

Anynoumous (2016-2019)

Cardenas was commissioned to create a photographic slide show for the LA Metro Blue line train.

Reflections and Gifts of East Los Angeles (2014)

A photography project created in conjunction with the 40th anniversary of Self-Help Graphics & Art.  Inspired by a street-photography project when Self-Help Graphics opened, Cardenas installed pop-up photo booths in select locations in east LA, and told subject that they could pick up their photographs at the same location a month later.  When the subject arrived to pick up their photographs, they found that their image was included in a large photo mural.

Publication 
On July 8, 2016, Cardenas released MAS ACA, a Self-Published Photography Book. This was his first collection book filled with over 100 black-and-white photographs from 2010 to 2015. This collection documents the East Los Angeles neighborhoods that go through a change of gentrification, are often unseen, and disappearing street landmarks. The book includes an introduction by Harry Gamboa Jr with poetry by Gloria Enedina Alvarez and Joseph Rios.

Exhibitions

Selected solo exhibitions 
 2018     Landscapes and Land Dwellers, La Plaza De Cultura y Artes
 2018     Backyard Tableaux, Vincent Price Art Museum
 2016   Anonymous, Los Angeles Metro Stations, Rotating Location till 2019
 2014    Because LA, Homegirl Cafe, Los Angeles, CA
 2014    Regalos y Recuerdos, Self Help Graphics, Los Angeles, CA
 2011    Boldly Boyle Heights, Primera Taza Gallery, Los Angeles, CA
 2010   In Perpetuum, Eastside Luv, Boyle Heights, CA

Selected group exhibitions 
 2022 Golden Hour: California Photography from the Los Angeles County Museum of Art - Touring So Cal
 2020  For the Love of LA (online) sponsored by The Music Center 
 2019 We Rise LA, Pop-Up, DTLA
 2017   Dia De Los Muertos, A Cultural Legacy, Past, Present and Future, Self Help Graphics & Art, PST LA/LA, Los Angeles, CA
 2017   Big LA Portrait Gallery, Grand Park, Los Angeles, CA
 2017  Tastemakers & Earthshakers: Notes From Los Angeles Youth Culture, 1943–2016, Vincent Price Museum of Art, Los Angeles, CA
 2014    Trece, Boathouse Gallery at Plaza De La Raza, Los Angeles, CA
 2013    Boyle Heights: Arte Vida Y Amor, Avenue 50 for LAC+USC Medical Center, Los Angeles, CA
 2011    End of the Year Print Show - Self Help Graphics, Los Angeles, CA

Honors and awards 
In 2016, the Boyle Heights Chamber of Commerce awarded Cardenas with an Outstanding Local Artist Award. In 2018, the Rema Hort Mann Foundation nominated Rafael Cardenas for Emerging Artist.

References

External links 
 http://www.rafa.la/
 http://www.rafa.la/new-page-1
 https://www.instagram.com/rafa.la/
 https://www.youtube.com/channel/UCQDkvTPChvuIaSMfGlNzg1w

1971 births
Living people